Recep Uçar (born 22 September 1975) is a Turkish football manager and former player who is currently the manager of Ümraniyespor.

Playing career
Uçar began playing football at the age of 10 with Ümraniyespor, before moving to Pendikspor at the age of 14. He began his career for 4 years with Pendikspor in TFF Second League, while graduating with an English degree in university. He moved to İstanbul Başakşehir in 1998 and became their captain, before returning to Pendikspor in 2006 and retiring in 2008.

Managerial career
From 2009 to 2019 he worked at İstanbul Başakşehir. He started as the first scout for İstanbul Başakşehir, and helped them scout players like Edin Višća, Doka Madureira, and Samuel Holmén before acting as long-time assistant manager under Abdullah Avcı. He also was assistant manager at Beşiktaş under Avcı for the 2019-20 season. 

Uçar was appointed as the manager of TFF First League club Ümraniyespor on 25 October 2020. He helped them achieve promotion to the Süper Lig for the first time after coming in second place 2021–22 TFF First League. ON 19 May 2020, he extended his contract with the club for 3 additional years.

References

External links
 
 Mackolik player profile

1975 births
Living people
People from Üsküdar
Footballers from Istanbul
Turkish footballers
Turkish football managers
Pendikspor footballers
İstanbul Başakşehir F.K. players
TFF First League players
TFF Second League players
Ümraniyespor managers
Association football fullbacks